Rashid Latif (born 14 October 1968), is a Pakistani cricket coach and former cricketer who played for the Pakistan national cricket team in Tests and One Day Internationals from 1992 to 2003 as a right-handed wicket-keeper batsman. He also served as the captain of the Pakistan team in 2003, leading the country in 6 Test and 25 one-day matches.

Early life and domestic career
Latif was born in Karachi to Abdul Latif Quraishi, who migrated to Pakistan from Uttar Pradesh, India, during the 1950s while Rashid's half-brother, Shahid Latif, remained in India where he worked for a newspaper in Kolkata, West Bengal.

He earned a BSc in computer systems engineering from NED University of Engineering and Technology with Saeed Anwar, where he joined APMSO. In April 2006, Latif retired from first-class cricket as he toured with the Pakistani senior players to play against Indian senior players in April 2006 in a series played between players who have retired from professional cricket. Latif has not participated in domestic first-class cricket since 2005. His last match was in 2006, when he played for Lashings Cricket Club, a club in England.

International career
Latif started playing for the Pakistan national cricket team in 1992 after the 1992 Cricket World Cup. He impressed the national selectors by scoring 50 runs in his Test debut, however it did not cement his place in the national squad as throughout his career he had to compete with another Pakistani wicket-keeper, Moin Khan. Despite having a significantly similar Test batting average, Moin had a higher ODI average than Latif and scored more runs than Latif in international cricket. However, Moin had the keeping record of 2.14 dismissals per test against Latif 3.51 per test. Moreover, in all time Pakistani XI Latif picks as wicket-keeper and hence 69 test matches of Moin is a question mark in Rashid Latif tenure. In 1996, he announced his retirement after conflicts with some players and the team management. He returned to the Pakistan team and became the captain of the National side in 1998.

Latif remained out of the national squad until 2001, when after a string of poor performances, the Pakistan team replaced Moin Khan. After returning into the squad, he secured his place by keeping the wicket and giving a string of good batting performances. The highlight of his career came after the 2003 Cricket World Cup, when he was announced the captain of the Pakistan team. Under his leadership, Pakistan successfully experimented with several new players and the team gave positive results. He was also involved with uniting the players through his captaincy in both on and off the cricket field. However, problems between Latif and the team management again surfaced in 2003–04, which resulted in him giving away the captaincy to former Pakistan batsman Inzamam-ul-Haq. He was omitted from the squad and since then has never been recalled in the team, despite his attempts to get back into the squad during 2003–05.

Dropped catch controversy and end of Test career 
Rashid Latif claimed a catch against Bangladesh batsman Alok Kapali in Multan in 2003. However, replays showed clearly that the catch was dropped and Rashid deliberately claimed a dropped catch. At the time, he maintained his innocence and stated that he knew he had not taken a clean catch, he would have called the batsman back. Mike Procter, the match referee, found Rashid guilty and banned him for five international matches. The game was very close, and Bangladesh lost the game by just one wicket. Rashid Latif later acknowledged that he knowingly and wrongfully claimed that catch. However, he stated that he had no regret over his action.  "I did realize immediately that the ball rolled out of my hand and it touched the ground. I conveyed that to my senior players. I gave an option to recall the batsman but it was decided that we will let him go. But I have no regrets." - Rashid Latif He was dropped from the squad and never got back in the Pakistan test squad after this incident.

Coaching career

Afghan coaching
In July 2010, Latif was appointed as the batting coach of the Afghanistan national cricket team. Latif  stated that the Afghan players were keen to learn from him. Latif further added that he liked the challenge of coaching the team and helping at grass-roots level of Afghan cricket; in July 2010 he also talked about having a Pakistan-Afghanistan cricket series in late 2010 to help Pakistan return to staging international cricket. As a wicket-keeper Latif also commented on the form of Pakistani wicket-keeper Kamran Akmal by stating that "Kamran has gained weight for a wicket-keeper, his wicket-keeping has been poor due to that and a lot of work load as a cricketer. I strongly suggest to all wicket-keepers that when they are struggling they take a rest and then comeback to the scene stronger as poor wicket-keeping can destroy you confidence as a batsman." In August 2010 the coach of the Afghan team Kabir Khan announced that he was going to leave his post because of consistent interference by the board. This led to Latif, who was batting coach at the time, to be named his successor. However just after that Latif announced his resignation also citing consistent interference caused by the board.

Latif's stint as Afghan coach got off to a good start when Afghanistan registered a 162-run win over Kenya in the ICC Intercontinental Cup but then lost the first ODI by 92 runs as Kenya were bowled out for 160. But then Afghanistan's batting order collapsed for 88. The team took a six-wicket victory during the second ODI as Kenya succumbed to 139 and Afghanistan suffered a poor start with opener Noor Ali retiring hurt and Karim Sadiq being caught. However Asghar Stanikzai scored his second half-century and along with Mohammad Shahzad who scored 37 guided the run chase. The finest moment of Latif's coaching career came at the 2010 Asian Games when Afghanistan upset the cricket super-power Pakistan in the semi-final as Afghanistan sealed a comfortable 22-run victory and set up a final tie with Bangladesh. However Afghanistan lost the final but the celebrated accomplishment was that the Afghanistan collected their first ever Asian games medal with a second-place silver.

Latif's team next assignment was the ICC Intercontinental Cup and Afghanistan play Scotland in the final. Latif stated that Afghanistan likes to play aggressive cricket and that the players are mentally very tough and hate to lose. On 2 December the match against Scotland started and because of Hamid Hassan Scotland were bowled out for 212. More than half of Scotland's runs came from Neil McCallum who scored 104*. Afghanistan got off to a good start but collapsed to 171 all out, giving Scotland a 41-run lead. Despite this another great bowling performance from Hassan and Samiullah Shenwari meant that Scotland were skittled for just 82 in their second innings. On the third day Afghanistan sealed victory early in the day with seven-wickets in hand courtesy of a superb 56* by Mohammad Shahzad.

Controversy
In 2010, Latif responded to the spot-fixing allegations against the Pakistan team by saying that ICC needs to re-design its laws and rules to root out the match-fixing and spot-fixing problem. Latif wrote a letter to the ICC citing his concerns back in 2003,"In that letter, I told them to change the rules and laws in one-day internationals which, were more prone to spot-fixing. I even offered to assist the ICC's Anti-Corruption and Security Unit but I got no response," he said.

"The key is to design laws and rules that do not allow players and bookmakers to manipulate things. I told the ICC remove the fielding restrictions and they introduced the power-play which only encouraged fixing."

Following this statement Latif resigned from his job as wicket-keeping coach at the Pakistan National Cricket Academy and subsequently reconciled with the Afghan Cricket Board and returned as the team's coach He stated that his aim was to help the team get the status to play Test cricket in two years' time. Latif also stated that he believed that a broad-cast delay of 30 seconds would help curb fixing.

Pakistan Super League
He is currently one of the members of the advisory board as well as director of PSL's franchise Karachi Kings.

References

External links
 
 
 Rashid Latif Cricket Academy
 Rashid Latif's Official website

1968 births
Living people
Pakistan One Day International cricketers
Pakistan Test cricket captains
Pakistan Test cricketers
United Bank Limited cricketers
Karachi cricketers
Cricketers at the 1996 Cricket World Cup
Cricketers at the 2003 Cricket World Cup
Pakistani cricket coaches
Pakistani cricket captains
Pakistani cricketers
Cricketers from Karachi
Karachi Whites cricketers
Karachi Blues cricketers
Pakistan Universities cricketers
Allied Bank Limited cricketers
Coaches of the Afghanistan national cricket team
NED University of Engineering & Technology alumni
Muhajir people
Wicket-keepers